Piers Alexander Gilliver  (born 17 September 1994) is a British wheelchair fencer, who competes in both épée and sabre. He is the 2020 Paralympic champion in the Individual Épée, A classification. He is the first British Paralympic champion in the sport since Carol Walton in 1988.

Gilliver has previously won medals at both World and European Championship level. In 2016 he represented Great Britain at the Rio Paralympics and won a silver medal

Personal history
Gilliver was born in Gloucester England in 1994. He attended Hopebrook C of E School in Longhope. He has Ehlers-Danlos Syndrome a congenital illness which in 2007 left him as a full-time wheelchair user.

Wheelchair fencing career
Gilliver first got into wheelchair fencing in 2010 at his local fencing club in Cheltenham after looking for a new sport as his mobility decreased. He joined the British Disabled Fencing Association in 2011. In 2012 Gilliver made his international debut for the British team at a World Cup event in Warsaw, coming 11th in the Category A épée.

In 2013 Gilliver took part in his first IWAS World Championships. The same year he was named Junior World Champion in the U23's Category A épée. In the buildup to the 2016 Summer Paralympics in Rio, Gilliver took nine podium finishes at international matches including the silver medal at the IWAS wheelchair fencing World Championships in Eger. In 2016 he was selected for TeamGB at the 2016 Summer Paralympics where he gained a silver medal in the Épée A.

In July 2021 Gilliver, Dimitri Coutya, Gemma Collis-McCann and Oliver Lam-Watson were identified as the British wheelchair fencing team who would compete at the delayed 2020 Summer Paralymics in Tokyo, where he won gold in the Épée A, silver in the Team Foil and bronze in the Team Épée.

Gilliver was appointed Member of the Order of the British Empire (MBE) in the 2022 New Year Honours for services to fencing.

References

External links 
 
 

1994 births
Living people
People with Ehlers–Danlos syndrome
British male sabre fencers
British male épée fencers
Paralympic wheelchair fencers of Great Britain
Wheelchair fencers at the 2016 Summer Paralympics
Medalists at the 2016 Summer Paralympics
Paralympic medalists in wheelchair fencing
Team Bath Paralympic athletes
Paralympic silver medalists for Great Britain
Wheelchair fencers at the 2020 Summer Paralympics
Medalists at the 2020 Summer Paralympics
Members of the Order of the British Empire